Michel Jacques Louis Baranger (31 July 1927, Le Mans – 1 October 2014, Tucson, Arizona) was a Franco-American theoretical physicist.

Baranger matriculated in 1945 at the École normale supérieure, Paris, graduating there in 1949. In 1951 he received from Cornell University his PhD under Hans Bethe with dissertation Relativistic Corrections to the Lamb shift. (Bethe, L. M. Brown, and John R. Stehn had previously calculated a non-relavistic estimate of the Lamb shift.) At Cornell University and then at Caltech from 1953 to 1955, he was also an assistant to Richard Feynman. In 1955 Baranger joined the physics department of Carnegie Institute of Technology, where he became an assistant professor in 1956 and a full professor in 1964. In 1969 he became a professor at MIT, where he retired as professor emeritus in 1997. After retirement from MIT, he worked at the New England Complex Systems Institute and was an adjunct professor at the University of Arizona, Tucson.

In 1961/62 he was Senior Fellow of the National Science Foundation at the Sorbonne.

He was a US citizen. He was elected a Fellow of the American Physical Society in 1968.

Upon his death he was survived by two sons, a daughter, four grandchildren, and three former wives: Elizabeth Baranger (born 1927, a physicist and eldest child of Harold Urey), Anne Gerard and Mary Lee Baranger.

References

External links
 New England Complex Systems Institute page
 Homepage
 Baranger  Chaos, complexity and entropy - a physics talk for non physicists , pdf file
 Baranger "A microscopic view of nuclear collective properties", Journal de Physique 1972

French physicists
20th-century American physicists
21st-century American physicists
École Normale Supérieure alumni
Cornell University alumni
Carnegie Mellon University faculty
MIT Center for Theoretical Physics faculty
Fellows of the American Physical Society
1927 births
2014 deaths